Clayon Maduro (born 5 March 1989) is an Aruban international footballer who earned two caps for the national team in 2008.

References

1989 births
Living people
Aruban footballers
Aruba international footballers
Association football midfielders
SV Racing Club Aruba players